Guildfordia radians is a species of sea snail, a marine gastropod mollusk in the family Turbinidae, the turban snails.

Distribution
This marine species occurs off Papua New Guinea and Western Australia.

References

Further reading
 Dekker H. 2008. Description of a new species of Guildfordia (Gastropoda: Turbinidae) from Western Australia. Miscellanea Malacologica, 3(2): 21–23
 Alf A. & Kreipl K. (2011) The family Turbinidae. Subfamilies Turbininae Rafinesque, 1815 and Prisogasterinae Hickman & McLean, 1990. In: G.T. Poppe & K. Groh (eds), A Conchological Iconography. Hackenheim: Conchbooks. pp. 1–82, pls 104–245.

radians
Gastropods described in 2008